Donald Charles Bauer (17 May 1922 – 15 January 1996) was an Australian rules footballer who played with Footscray and Geelong in the Victorian Football League (VFL).

Bauer, who served in the Royal Australian Air Force during the Second World War, was from Chilwell in Geelong but could not play for his local VFL club in 1943 as they were in recess. He instead made 10 senior appearances for Footscray. A defender, Bauer joined Geelong midway through the 1945 season and from then until 1949 was a regular fixture in the team. Bauer joined City in the Northern Tasmanian Football Association at the end of the 1949 VFL season, as captain-coach. He had been offered the job a year earlier but was refused a clearance by Geelong. In his only season, Bauer guided City to the grand final, which they lost to North Launceston by 30 points.

In 1951 he left Tasmania and became captain-coach of Ballarat Football League side Geelong West. He remained in the role for two years. He was senior coach of Newtown & Chilwell in 1958.

References

1922 births
1996 deaths
Australian rules footballers from Victoria (Australia)
Western Bulldogs players
Geelong Football Club players
City-South Football Club players
City-South Football Club coaches
Geelong West Football Club players
Geelong West Football Club coaches
Royal Australian Air Force personnel of World War II
People from Colac, Victoria
Royal Australian Air Force airmen